is a professor in the Department of Psychology at The University of Warwick. Kita's work focuses on the psycholinguistic properties of gestures accompanying speech, relations between spatial language and cognition, language development, and sound symbolism.

Biography 
Kita received his PhD from the University of Chicago in 1993, working in the lab of David McNeill. His dissertation focused on spontaneous gestures and Japanese mimetics. From 1993-2003 Kita led the Gesture Project at Max Planck Institute for Psycholinguistics, one of the research foci of the MPI.

Since April 2017, Kita has served as the editor of GESTURE (published by John Benjamins). Kita was president of the International Society for Gesture Studies from 2012–2014, and vice-president from 2010-2012.

Kita's research has been funded by the National Science Foundation, the Leverhulme Trust, and other agencies.

Appointments 
 1993-2003 Led the Gesture Project at Max Planck Institute for Psycholinguistics
 1993-1994 Postdoctoral Researcher at Max Planck Institute for Psycholinguistics
 1994-2003 Senior Researcher at Max Planck Institute for Psycholinguistics
 2003-2006 Senior Lecturer at the Dept. of Experimental Psychology in the University of Bristol
 2006-2013 Reader at the School of Psychology in the University of Birmingham
 2013–present Professor of Psychology of Language at University of Warwick

Books 
 Kita, S. (2002). Jesuchaa: kangaeru karada [Gesture: the body that thinks]. Kaneko Shobo.
Kita, S. (Ed.) (2003). Pointing: Where language, culture, and cognition meet. Psychology Press

Selected publications 
 Chu, M., & Kita, S. (2011). The nature of gestures' beneficial role in spatial problem solving. Journal of Experimental Psychology: General, 140(1), 102-115. https://dx.doi.org/10.1037/a0021790
 Imai, M., Kita, S., Nagumo, M., & Okada, H. (2008). Sound symbolism between a word and an action facilitates early verb learning. Cognition, 109(1), 54-65. https://dx.doi.org/10.1016/j.cognition.2008.07.015 
 Kita, S. (1997). Two-dimensional semantic analysis of Japanese mimetics. Linguistics, 35, 379-415. https://doi.org/10.1515/ling.1997.35.2.379 
Kita, S., & Özyürek, A. (2003). What does cross-linguistic variation in semantic coordination of speech and gesture reveal?: Evidence for an interface representation of spatial thinking and speaking. Journal of Memory and Language, 48, 16-32. https://dx.doi.org/10.1016/S0749-596X(02)00505-3 
Mumford, K. H., & Kita, S. (2014). Children Use Gesture to Interpret Novel Verb Meanings. Child Development, 85(3), 1181-1189. https://dx.doi.org/10.1111/cdev.12188 
Senghas, A., Kita, S., & Özyürek, A. (2004). Children creating core properties of language: Evidence from an emerging sign language in Nicaragua. Science, 305(5697), 1779-1782. https://dx.doi.org/10.1126/science.1100199 Open Access Pre-Print: http://wrap.warwick.ac.uk/66237/

External links 
 Sotaro Kita's Warwick University homepage
Sotaro Kita publications indexed by Google Scholar

References 

Linguists from Japan
University of Chicago alumni
Psycholinguistics
Psycholinguists
1963 births
Living people
Date of birth missing (living people)